Sergei Aleksandrovich Bulatov (born 21 March 1972) is a Russian professional football coach and a former player. He is an assistant coach with PFC Krylia Sovetov Samara.

Club career
As a player, he made his debut in the Soviet Second League in 1989 for FC Uralmash Sverdlovsk.

Honours
 Russian First Division top scorer: 1995 (29 goals).

References

1972 births
Sportspeople from Yekaterinburg
Living people
Soviet footballers
Russian footballers
Association football forwards
FC Ural Yekaterinburg players
FC Baltika Kaliningrad players
Russian Premier League players
PFC Krylia Sovetov Samara players
FC Fakel Voronezh players
FC Rubin Kazan players
FC Akhmat Grozny players
FC KAMAZ Naberezhnye Chelny players
Russian football managers
FC Volgar Astrakhan managers
FC Ural Yekaterinburg managers
FC Ararat Moscow managers
FC Fakel Voronezh managers
FC Yenisey Krasnoyarsk players
FC Ararat Yerevan managers
Russian expatriate football managers
Expatriate football managers in Armenia
FC Uralets Nizhny Tagil players
FC Zvezda Perm players